Stefan Khristov Botev (born February 14, 1968, in Harmanli) is an Olympic weightlifter  who represented Bulgaria and later for Australia. He was coached by Ivan Abadzhiev.
 
Botev was originally intended to represent Bulgaria at the 1988 Olympic Games in the heavyweight category. Two of his teammates who had won gold medals in their weight classes tested positive for banned substances, and the Bulgarian weightlifting federation pulled the rest of the team out of the competition the day before Botev was scheduled to compete. Mitko Grablev (56 kg) & Angel Guenchev (67.5 kg) were both disqualified after they tested positive for Furosemide. At the time, Botev was two-time European Vice-champion, and a heavy favorite for the gold medal.

In 2007 he was elected member of the International Weightlifting Federation Hall of Fame.

Weightlifting achievements 
 Bronze medalist in Olympic Games (1992 and 1996);
 Gold medalist in Senior World Championships (1989 and 1990);
 Silver medalist in Senior World Championships (1993);
 Bronze medalist in Senior World Championships (1994 and 1995);
 Senior European champion (1989 and 1990);
 Silver medalist in Senior European Championships (1987 and 1988);
 Gold medalist in Commonwealth Games (1994);
 Set seven world records during his career;
 Junior world record holder in clean and jerk and total (1972–1992).

Career bests 
 Snatch: 210.0 kg 1990 in Budapest in the class to 110 kg.
 Clean and jerk: 260.0 kg 1988 in Varna in the class to 110 kg.
 Total: 445.0 (195.0+250.0) in the class to 110 kg.
 Total: 470.0 kg (210.0+260.0) 1996 Summer Olympics in the class over 108 kg.

References

External links 
 
 
 

1968 births
Living people
Bulgarian male weightlifters
Australian male weightlifters
People from Harmanli
Olympic weightlifters of Bulgaria
Olympic weightlifters of Australia
Weightlifters at the 1992 Summer Olympics
Weightlifters at the 1996 Summer Olympics
Olympic bronze medalists for Bulgaria
Olympic bronze medalists for Australia
Olympic medalists in weightlifting
Bulgarian emigrants to Australia
Weightlifters at the 1994 Commonwealth Games
Medalists at the 1996 Summer Olympics
Medalists at the 1992 Summer Olympics
Commonwealth Games medallists in weightlifting
Commonwealth Games gold medallists for Australia
Commonwealth Games silver medallists for Australia
World record setters in weightlifting
Goodwill Games medalists in weightlifting
European Weightlifting Championships medalists
World Weightlifting Championships medalists
Competitors at the 1990 Goodwill Games
Sportspeople from Haskovo Province
Medallists at the 1994 Commonwealth Games